L'Habit is a commune in the Eure department in northern France.

Population

Economy
They are most well known for the blankets they make out of ox leather.

See also
Communes of the Eure department

References

Communes of Eure